Vietnam worm snake (Argyrophis giadinhensis) is a species of snake in the family Typhlopidae. It is endemic to Vietnam.

References

Argyrophis
Snakes of Vietnam
Endemic fauna of Vietnam
Reptiles described in 1937
Taxa named by René Léon Bourret